John Barry Williamson (born 3 March 1981) is an English former professional footballer who played as a defender. He made one appearance in the Football League Second Division for Burnley, coming on as a substitute in the 4–3 win over Macclesfield Town on 28 March 1999.

External links

Footballers from Derby
English footballers
Association football defenders
Burnley F.C. players
English Football League players
1981 births
Living people